Jidi is a Village Development Committee in Baglung District in Gandaki Province of central Nepal.

Populated places in Baglung District